Frederick II, The Gentle (Friedrich, der Sanftmütige; Frederick the Gentle) (22 August 1412 – 7 September 1464) was Elector of Saxony (1428–1464) and was Landgrave of Thuringia (1440–1445).

Biography
Frederick was born in Leipzig, the eldest of the seven children of Frederick I, Elector of Saxony, and Catherine of Brunswick and Lunenburg.

After the death of his father in 1428 he took over the government together with his younger brothers William III, Henry and Sigismund. In 1433 the Wettins finally concluded peace with the Hussites and in 1438 Frederick led Saxon forces to victory in the Battle of Sellnitz. That same year it was considered the first federal state parliament of Saxony. The parliament received the right to find together in case of innovations in fiscal matters also without summoning by the ruler.

Also in 1438 it was decided that Frederick, and not his rival Bernard IV, duke of Saxe-Lauenburg, was entitled to exercise the Saxon electoral vote at the elections for the German throne. The elector then aided Albert II to secure this dignity, performing a similar service for his own brother-in-law, Frederick two years later.

After Henry's death in 1435, and Sigismund was forced to renounce and became a bishop (in 1440), Frederick and William divided their possessions. In the Division of Altenburg in 1445, William III received the Thuringian and Frankish part, and Frederick got the Eastern part of the principality. The mines remained common possessions. Disputes over the distribution led however in 1446 to the Saxon Brother War, which found an end only on 27 January 1451 with the peace of Naumburg. In the Treaty of Eger in (1459), elector Frederick, Duke William III and the king of Bohemia George of Podebrady fixed the borders between Bohemia and Saxony, at the height of the Ore Mountains and the middle of the Elbe which still holds today. It belongs therefore to the oldest still existing borders of Europe.

After the death of Frederick, in Leipzig, both of his sons, Ernest and Albert, first took over the government together. After Duke William III died in 1482, Thuringia returned to Frederick's line.

Family and issue
In Leipzig, Electoral Saxony on 3 June 1431 Frederick married Margaret of Austria, the daughter of Ernest of Austria and Cymburgis of Masovia. They had eight children:
 Amalia (b. Meissen, 4 August 1436 – d. Rochlitz, 19 October 1501), married on 21 March 1452 to Louis IX, Duke of Bavaria.
 Anna (b. Meissen, 7 March 1437 – d. Neustadt am Aisch, 31 October 1512), married on 12 November 1458 to Albert III Achilles, Elector of Brandenburg.
 Frederick (b. Meissen, 28 August 1439 – d. Meissen, 23 December 1451).
 Ernest, Elector of Saxony (b. Meissen, 24 March 1441 – d. Colditz, 26 August 1486).
 Albert, Duke of Saxony (b. Grimma, 31 July 1443 – d. Emden, 12 September 1500).
 Margaret (b. Meissen?, 1444 – d. Seusslitz?, ca. 19 November 1498), Abbess of Seusslitz.
 Hedwig (b. Meissen?, 31 October 1445 – d. Quedlinburg, 13 June 1511), Abbess of Quedlinburg (1458).
 Alexander (b. Meissen, 24 June 1447 – d. Meissen, 14 September 1447).

July 1455 saw the Prinzenraub, the attempt of a knight named Kunz von Kaufungen to abduct Frederick's sons Ernest and Albert. Having carried them off from Altenburg, Kunz was making his way to Bohemia when the plot was accidentally discovered and the princes restored.

Ancestry

References

  Article in the ADB
  Die Wettiner

1412 births
1464 deaths
People from Leipzig
Prince-electors of Saxony
Knights of the Golden Fleece
House of Wettin
Saxon princes
Imperial vicars
Margraves of Meissen
Landgraves of Thuringia